Patrick Madrid (born November 8, 1960) is an American Catholic, author, and radio host. His many books include Why Be Catholic? (Penguin Random House), Life Lessons: 50 Things I Learned in My First 50 Years (Ignatius Press), and How to Do Apologetics (Our Sunday Visitor). His books have sold over one million copies, including foreign-language editions.

He hosts the “Patrick Madrid Show” radio program on Relevant Radio, three hours daily.

Aside from his radio presence, Madrid is best known for his work in Catholic apologetics. He worked for eight years (1988 to 1996) at Catholic Answers, serving as vice president. He has published numerous articles on Scripture, Church history, patristics, apologetics, and evangelization in various Catholic and Protestant periodicals and has contributed scholarly articles on apologetics in the New Catholic Encyclopedia.

He and his wife, Nancy, have 11 children and 28 grandchildren.

Early life
Patrick Madrid was born on November 8, 1960, in Lynwood, California, a near suburb of Los Angeles. His father, Bernard Madrid served for four years in the U.S. Coast Guard as a sailor, after which he had a long career as an electronics engineer. His mother, Gretchen, was a housewife. Madrid is the oldest of their eight children, one of whom died shortly after birth of pulmonary complications. Growing up in Southern California, Madrid was baptized at Saint Mary of the Assumption Catholic Church in Whittier and was raised primarily in Orange County, attending the Mission San Juan Capistrano Grammar School for several years.

Biography
Patrick Madrid has been a Catholic apologist since 1987. He hosts The Patrick Madrid Show on Relevant Radio weekdays 9-noon ET, discussing current events, modern culture, apologetics, and a variety of "God topics." Madrid does not have guests or conduct interviews on his show, but instead, engages listeners with personal commentary and interacts extensively with callers. He has conducted thousands of apologetics seminars in English and Spanish at parishes, conferences, and universities across the United States, as well as throughout Europe, Canada, in Latin America, Asia, Australia, New Zealand, and Israel. Since 1990, he has been a regular presenter at the Franciscan University of Steubenville's "Defending the Faith" summer apologetics conferences and has been a guest lecturer in theology at Christendom College in their "Major Speakers" program. Madrid has engaged in at least a dozen formal public debates with Protestant, Mormon, and other non-Catholic spokesmen.

He founded what is now known as the Envoy institute in 1996 with the launch of Envoy Magazine, which reached a peak circulation of approximately 12,000 paid subscribers. The magazine was discontinued in 2011 when it lost its institutional funding source.

Madrid earned a bachelor of science degree in business management from the University of Phoenix as well as a B.Phil in philosophy and an M.A. in dogmatic theology (cum laude) from the Pontifical College Josephinum in Columbus, Ohio. He did graduate studies in theology at the University of Dallas. He has taught undergraduate courses on apologetics and the sacraments as an adjunct professor on the theology faculty at Franciscan University of Steubenville. He currently serves as an adjunct professor of apologetics at Holy Apostles College and Seminary and at Saint Patrick's Seminary and University in Menlo Park, California.

A life-long avid fan of the Beatles, after playing trumpet in grammar school since the fourth grade, Madrid switched to the bass guitar at the age of 14, playing in various area garage bands, and eventually played bass for several years in Geneva Brown, an obscure Southern California rock band. He sometimes refers humorously on his radio show to his garage-band days by commenting on a particular word or phrase drawn news sources that he says would make for a "good garage band name."

References

Books 

 Surprised by Truth (Saint Benedict Press), 1994 
 Any Friend of God’s Is a Friend of Mine (Saint Benedict Press), 1996 
 Pope Fiction: Answers to 30 Myths and Misconceptions about the Papacy (Saint Benedict Press), 1999  
 Surprised by Truth 2 (Sophia Institute Press), 2000 
 Search and Rescue (Sophia Institute Press), 2001 
 Where Is That in the Bible? (Our Sunday Visitor), 2001 
 Surprised by Truth 3 (Sophia Institute Press), 2002 
 Why Is That in Tradition? (Our Sunday Visitor), 2002 
 Answer Me This (Our Sunday Visitor) 2003  
 More Catholic than the Pope (Our Sunday Visitor), 2004 
 Does the Bible Really Say That? (Servant Books), 2006 
 A Pocket Guide to Apologetics (Our Sunday Visitor), 2006  
 A Pocket Guide to Purgatory (Our Sunday Visitor), 2007  
  150 Bible Verses Every Catholic Should Know (Servant Books), 2008 ]
 The Godless Delusion: A Catholic Challenge to Modern Atheism (Our Sunday Visitor), 2010  
 Envoy for Christ: 25 Years as a Catholic Apologist (Servant Books), 2012 
 A Year With the Bible: Scriptural Wisdom for Daily Living (St. Benedict Press), 2012 
 Why Be Catholic? 10 Answers to a Very Important Question (Penguin Random House, 2013) 
 On a Mission: Lessons from Saint Francis de Sales (Servant Books), 2013 
 Scripture and Tradition in the Church (Sophia Institute Press), 2014 
 Now What? A Guide for New (and Not So New) Catholics (Servant Books), 2015 
 How to Do Apologetics (Our Sunday Visitor), 2015 
 Life Lessons: 50 Things I Learned in My First 50 Years (Ignatius Press), 2016 
 Surprised by Life (Sophia Institute Press), 2017  
 FORTHCOMING BOOKS: 
 What Am I Doing Here? 
 InQUIZition: Rack Your Brain & Stretch Your Knowledge (Sophia Institute Press)

External links
 
 Patrick Madrid on Relevant Radio
 
 
 Patrick Madrid on YouTube
 "Catholic Apologist Makes No Apologies for His Deep-Rooted Beliefs"
 Holy Apostles College: Professor Patrick Madrid

1960 births
Living people
American writers
American radio personalities
American Roman Catholic religious writers
Christian apologists
Franciscan University of Steubenville
Pontifical College Josephinum alumni
University of Dallas alumni
University of Phoenix alumni